Agrotis alticaffer is a moth of the family Noctuidae first described by Krüger in 2005. It is endemic to Lesotho.

External links
 

Agrotis
Endemic fauna of Lesotho
Moths of Africa
Moths described in 2005